Mantas Adomėnas (born 1 October 1972) is a Lithuanian classicist and politician. He was first elected to the Seimas in 2008 and served until 2020. He earned a Ph.D. degree in classics from the University of Cambridge. His best known work is probably the article The Fluctuating Fortunes of Heraclitus in Plato.

Adomėnas was designated as the Vice Chairman of the Homeland Union in 2017. He ran for a Seimas seat as an independent in 2020 and lost but was selected as deputy minister of foreign affairs in December 2020 by Gabrielius Landsbergis.

Influence peddling, other allegations
While Vice Chairman of Homeland Union Adomėnas was stripped of party membership in 2018 after being found guilty by party governance organs of influence peddling for MG Baltic, a business conglomerate with perceived Russian connections, with the aim of facilitating “capture of the party” by the business group.

Misogyny accusations
During a parliamentary sitting in 2010 Adomėnas publicly called a fellow MP Birutė Vėsaitė “vištų višta” (literally, a hen’s hen), inviting accusations of misogyny. He apologized 2 days later.

Support for Taiwan, Hong Kong independence
Adomėnas is a supporter of Taiwan and Hong Kong independence movements. He organized a rally with slightly over 100 participants on 23 August 2019, during the 2019–20 Hong Kong protests, in solidarity with a protest in Hong Kong named the "Baltic Way". During the rally, Adomėnas decried a group of about a dozen counter-protesters as having been "hired". 
Since March 2021 Adomėnas has been member of Lithuania-Taiwan Forum, an NGO supporting Taiwan independence. Gintaras Steponavičius, accused in the Liberal Party bribery case on behalf of MG Baltic, is also part of the initiative.

Adomėnas led Lithuania's decision to open Taiwan's de facto embassy in Lithuania in 2021 which resulted in unprecedented breakdown of China-Lithuania relations. Taiwan is recognized by a small handful of countries and has been found bribing foreign politicians to gain recognition on multiple occasions in the past..

References

Members of the Seimas
Politicians from Vilnius
1972 births
Living people
Lithuanian scholars of ancient Greek philosophy
Alumni of Gonville and Caius College, Cambridge
Vilnius University alumni
Members of the International Steering Committee of the Community of Democracies
21st-century Lithuanian politicians